Ljubeščica is a village and municipality in Croatia in Varaždin County. According to the 2001 census, there are 1,958 inhabitants, absolute majority which are Croats.

Municipalities of Croatia
Populated places in Varaždin County